KFOW (1170 AM) is a commercial radio station licensed to Waseca, Minnesota and serving South Central Minnesota.  The station is owned by the Linder Radio Group and broadcasts a talk radio format.  The radio studios and offices are on Cedardale Drive in Owatonna, Minnesota.

By day, KFOW is powered at 2,500 watts non-directional.  Because 1170 AM is a clear channel frequency reserved for Class A KTSB in Tulsa, Oklahoma, and WWVA in Wheeling, West Virginia, KFOW must reduce power at night to only five watts to avoid interference.  During critical hours, the station is powered at 1,000 watts.  Programming is also heard on 250 watt FM translator K292GU at 106.3 MHz.

Programming
KFOW largely broadcasts nationally syndicated conservative talk shows.  Weekdays begin with Hugh Hewitt, followed by Brian Kilmeade, Ben Shapiro, Dave Ramsey, Dan Bongino, "Our American Stories with Lee Habeeb" and "Red Eye Radio."  Local news and agriculture reports are featured during the day with local high school sports on some evenings.

On weekends, the schedule features shows on money, health, real estate, home repair, the military, guns, barbecuing, wine, farming, the outdoors, pets, travel and old time radio shows, as well as repeats of weekday shows and NASCAR racing.  Most hours begin with national news from Fox News Radio.

History
On , the station signed on the air as KOWO.  Originally it was a daytimer, powered at 1,000 watts and required to go off the air at night.  In later years, it increased its power and added limited nighttime service.

On October 7, 2020, KFOW dropped its classic hits format and began stunting with "Tie Me Kangaroo Down, Sport" by Rolf Harris, a common practice on stations owned by Linder when switching formats. On October 12, KFOW debuted a new talk radio format. As part of the flip, the station affiliated with Fox News Radio.

References

External links

Radio stations in Minnesota
Radio stations established in 1972
1972 establishments in Minnesota
News and talk radio stations in the United States